Hannah Brown Skeele (1829–1901) was an American painter, best known for her still-lifes, although she also produced portraits and pictures of animals.

Biography
Skeele was born in Kennebunkport, Maine. She was apparently self-taught and may have lived in New York for a few years before moving to St. Louis, where she lived and worked from 1858 to 1871. During those years, she was probably exposed to the still lifes of John F. Francis, who exhibited there, and Sarah Miriam Peale, who was a resident.

Her first exhibition was with the St. Louis Agricultural and Mechanical Association, shortly after her arrival. Most of her paintings include elaborately carved bowls and vases with fruits and flowers in fine botanical detail.

After returning to Maine, she found it necessary to support herself through portrait commissions from clergy, lawyers, university presidents and politicians such as Governor Israel Washburn Jr. This left her unable to create many more still lifes. She rarely signed her paintings, which has made attribution difficult. She died in Portland, Maine, in 1901.

References

External links

"Hannah Skeele exhibit at Brick Store Museum" from the Biddeford Journal Tribune 3/23/1982
Missouri Remembers Artists Portal

1829 births
1901 deaths
19th-century American painters
American still life painters
American portrait painters
Artists from Maine
People from Kennebunkport, Maine
American women painters